The Dress may refer to:
 The dress, a 2015 photograph and Internet phenomenon regarding the perceived colour of a dress

The Dress may also refer to:
 The Dress (1961 film), an East German film
 The Dress (1964 film), a Swedish film directed by Vilgot Sjöman
 The Dress (1984 film), winner of the 1984 BAFTA Award for Best Short Film
 The Dress (1996 film), a Dutch film
 The Dress (2020 film), a Polish short film
 "The Dress", a track from the Blonde Redhead album 23
 "The Dress", an episode from The Amazing World of Gumball

See also
Dress (disambiguation)
List of individual dresses
Black Versace dress of Elizabeth Hurley, often referred to as "That Dress"